P.S. 6, The Lillie Devereaux Blake School, is a public elementary school located on the Upper East Side of Manhattan, New York City. Founded in 1894, P.S. 6 is regarded as the top elementary school in New York City.

Overview
P.S. 6 has about 800 students in grades K-5. Average class sizes are 23-28. The school is popular with families on the Upper East Side who often choose to send their children there rather than to private school. The school's former Principal, Carmen Fariña, claimed that the acceptance rate for out of district students was 1/7, lower than that of many top-tier Universities.

History
P.S. 6 was founded in 1894 and named after the feminist author and reformer Lillie Devereaux Blake. The school was originally located several blocks to the north on 85th Street. The current red brick building on Madison Avenue between 81st and 82nd Streets was constructed in 1953.

The school's first principal Katherine Blake, the daughter of the school's namesake, served in that capacity for 34 years and demanded that the pacifist hymn I Didn't Raise My Boy to Be a Soldier be sung at every assembly.

Academics
P.S. 6 is a Teacher's College "Mentor School." It offers a particularly strong writing program based on the principles of Lucy Calkins. Students are expected to write plays, poetry, essays and short fiction by the time they graduate. The school also places a special emphasis on Art education. Its location, two blocks from the Metropolitan Museum of Art, allows the students particularly good access to view the works of famous artists. P.S. 6 was also the recipient of a grant from the Annenberg Foundation to help fund art projects in the school.

Special events
Peter Yarrow has played a special benefit concert in the school's auditorium for many years to raise money for the school.

In popular culture
The school is featured in the 1979 film Kramer vs. Kramer, which won five Academy Awards.

Notable alumni

Richard Avedon, Photographer
Phoebe Cates, Actress
Chevy Chase, Actor
Peter Cincotti, Jazz Singer/Songwriter
Miguel Condé, Artist
Damon Dash, Hip Hop Mogul
Jose Feliciano, Guitarist
William Hurt, Actor
Robert Iler, Actor
Jonathan Katz, Actor/Comedian
Lenny Kravitz, Musician
Michael Kurland, Author
Lorna Luft, Actress, Singer, Daughter of Judy Garland
Erin Moriarty, Actress
Tony Roberts (actor), Actor
J.D. Salinger, Author of The Catcher in the Rye
Andrew Schulz, Comedian
Tschabalala Self, Artist
Herbert Solow (journalist), Writer, Editor of Fortune magazine
Mark Sourian Film Producer
Andrew Stein, Former President NYC Council, Former Manhattan Borough President
Robert F. Wagner Jr., Mayor of New York and Ambassador to Spain
David L. Wolper, Producer
Peter Yarrow, Singer

References

External links

 Official P.S. 6 Website

Public elementary schools in Manhattan
Educational institutions established in 1894
1894 establishments in New York (state)